Concas is an Italian surname. Notable people with the surname include:

Fabio Concas (born 1986), Italian footballer
Graziella Concas (born 1970), Italian classical pianist and composer

Italian-language surnames